"A Fair Affair (Je T'Aime)" is a song by British–Swiss singer-songwriter Misty Oldland, released in 1994 as the second single from her debut album, Supernatural (1994). It was a number five hit in Iceland, while peaking at number ten in the Netherlands and number 20 in France. The song samples "Je t'aime... moi non plus" by Serge Gainsbourg. The accompanying music video was directed by British director Jake Nava.

Critical reception
Tim de Lisle from The Independent wrote, "The tune draws on "Dizzy" and "Je t'aime", the words are like an unusually witty lecture and the whole thing is a beguiling pop-rap song." Neil Spencer from The Observer felt that Oldland's debut single "suggests she has found the slinky, club pop to fit her persona".

Track listing
 7" single, France (1994)
A: "A Fair Affair (Je T'aime)" – 4:00
B:	"Caroline" (Live Acoustic Session) – 3:30

 12", UK (1994)
A1: "A Fair Affair (Je T'aime)" (Misty's Magic Mix)
A2: "A Fair Affair (Je T'aime)" (Soulfish Mix)
B1: "A Fair Affair (Je T'aime)" (Misty's Biznizz Mix)
B2: "A Fair Affair (Je T'aime)" (4AM Chillum Mix)

 CD maxi, UK & Europe (1994)
"A Fair Affair (Je T'aime)" (7") – 4:03
"A Fair Affair (Je T'aime)" (Misty's Magic Mix) – 4:49
"A Fair Affair (Je T'aime)" (Misty's Biznizz Mix) – 4:56
"Caroline" (Live Acoustic Session) – 3:30

Charts

References

1994 songs
1994 singles
Columbia Records singles
Music videos directed by Jake Nava
Songs written by Serge Gainsbourg
British soft rock songs